Coal slurry is a mixture of solids (mined coal or coal waste) and liquids (water or organic) produced by a coal preparation plant.

Preparation 
To transform the coal ash into a slurry, coal is separated from non-combustible components and can be fractionated by particle size as well. Coal slurry can be transferred by pipeline or with specialized pumps such as a progressive cavity pump to pump the highly abrasive, corrosive and viscous coal slurry. More than 7 billion tons of coal are mined per year (2010), using approximately 200 litres of water per ton. However, the amount of water required hinges on the surface characteristics of the coal being used. Most coal slurries require the addition of a surfactant to reduce the viscosity, ergo reduce the stress on pipelines and pumps.

Recent studies have employed new methods of slurry preparation, like using ultrasonic irradiation and a mixture of natural and synthetic surfactants to improve the stability and rheological properties of coal slurry.

Environmental concerns

Ideally, coal slurry consists only of crushed coal and water, which can be efficiently separated.  In practice, the separation is significantly costly due to the large amounts of water needed and wastewater generated by the process. Furthermore, the slurry consists also of very fine coal dust that results in a waste called blackwater. As blackwater cannot be purified by a water treatment plant, it is stored in large impoundment ponds. Such ponds are susceptible to disastrous releases, such as the Buffalo Creek flood of 1972 or the Martin County coal slurry spill of 2000, which released over 250 million gallons of coal slurry. Coal slurry can contain hazardous chemicals such as arsenic and mercury and can kill aquatic wildlife, as was the case in the Martin County spill. This impounded liquid waste can sometimes total billions of gallons in a single facility.

See also

Coal-water slurry fuel
Pulverized coal
Sludge (film)
Tailings dam

References

External links 

Coal mining
Waste
Environmental impact of the coal industry
Water pollution
Energy accidents and incidents